Elisa Rea (born 23 March 1968) is a retired Italian athlete who competed in middle-distance events. She represented her country at two World Indoor Championships.

Achievements

Personal bests
Outdoor
800 metres – 2:03.59 (Trento 1997)
1500 metres – 4:09.32 (Rome 1998)
One mile – 4:30.03 (Rome 1993)
3000 metres – 8:48.76 (Rome 1999)
5000 metres – 15:26.50 (Pescara 1999)
Indoor
1500 metres – 4:11.49 (Genoa 1998)
3000 metres – 8:51.00 (Genoa 1998)

References

External links
 

1968 births
Living people
Italian female middle-distance runners
Italian female long-distance runners
Athletics competitors of Gruppo Sportivo Forestale
Competitors at the 1993 Summer Universiade
Competitors at the 1995 Summer Universiade
Athletes (track and field) at the 1991 Mediterranean Games
Athletes (track and field) at the 1993 Mediterranean Games
Athletes (track and field) at the 1997 Mediterranean Games
Mediterranean Games competitors for Italy